"Painkillr" is a song recorded by American singer and songwriter Erika Jayne. It reached number one on Billboards Hot Dance Club Play chart in 2014. "Painkillr" was written by Erika Jayne and Christopher Rodriguez. Erika Jayne has described the song by saying: "The idea came to me one night from a darker place. It was how I was feeling at the time. Obviously, with that type of material, it's not set very high in the register. So we set it low, made it yummy, sexy and 1930-ish."

Music video 
The black-and-white music video shows Jayne in bed wearing a revealing bodysuit and heels. It was produced by Jayne herself and shot in half a day. "I had a photoshoot in the morning, and then shot it in the afternoon. That's how tight that video was," she told People magazine. The music video was directed by her long-time collaborator Mikey Minden. Minden described that the music video was intended to be "edgy, dark, gritty, in-your-face, provocative, super-sexy, super-stylized, and very theatrical."

Television personality Bethenny Frankel criticized the music video in an episode of The Real Housewives of Beverly Hills in 2016.

Track listing 
Over twenty different remixes and radio edits were created specifically for the digital download release of "Painkillr";

Charts

Weekly charts

Year-end charts

Release history

See also 
List of number-one dance singles of 2014 (US)

References 

2014 singles
2014 songs